Hotel Haywire is a 1937 American comedy film written by Preston Sturges with uncredited rewrites by Lillie Hayward.  It was directed by George Archainbaud and stars Leo Carrillo, Lynne Overman, Spring Byington, Benny Baker and Colette Lyons.

Plot
Dentist Henry Parkhouse (Lynne Overman) and his wife Minerva (Spring Byington) have a perfect marriage until a practical joke backfires and she finds a lady's chemise in his coat pocket.  Wife and husband both consult Dr. Zodiac Z. Zippe (Leo Carrillo) about what to do, and vaudevillians-turned-detectives Bertie and Genevieve Sterns (Benny Baker and Collette Lyons) get involved as well.  On his lawyer's advice, Henry rents a hotel room to set up a compromising situation, only the Parkhouses' daughter Phyllis (Mary Carlisle) is in the same hotel to elope with Frank Ketts (John Patterson), and plans to get married in the room next to Henry's.  When Judge Sterling Newhall (Porter Hall) shows up to officiate, he knocks on Henry's door looking for a witness.  Eventually, Henry and Minnie make up, Frank and Phyliis get married, and Dr. Zippe is run out of town.

Cast
Leo Carrillo as Dr. Zodiac Z. Zippe
Mary Carlisle as Phyllis
Lynne Overman as Dr. Parkhouse
George Barbier as I. Ketts
Spring Byington as Mrs. Parkhouse
Benny Baker as Bertie Sterns
Collette Lyons as Genevieve Stern
John Patterson (actor) as Frank Ketts
Porter Hall as Judge Newhall
Josephine Whittell as Mrs. Newhall
Ellen Drew as Switchboard Operator
Cast notes
Leo Carrillo is best remembered today for playing "Pancho" on the TV series The Cisco Kid. Leo Carrillo State Park near Malibu, California is named after him.

Franklin Pangborn, who would go on to be one of the character actors frequently used by Preston Sturges in the movies he wrote and directed, has a small uncredited part as a Fuller Brush Man.

Production
Preston Sturges was paid $17,500 by Paramount to write Hotel Haywire for Charlie Ruggles, Mary Boland, George Burns and Gracie Allen.  When Burns and Allen left the studio and the film was recast, Lillie Hayward was brought in to do rewrites.

Some of the scenes in Hotel Haywire were filmed at the Glendale, California train station.

Notes

External links
 
 
 

1937 films
1937 comedy films
American black-and-white films
Films directed by George Archainbaud
Paramount Pictures films
Films with screenplays by Preston Sturges
American comedy films
1930s English-language films
1930s American films